This is a list of notable and commonly used emoticons, or textual portrayals of a writer's moods or facial expressions in the form of icons. Originally, these icons consisted of ASCII art, and later, Shift JIS art and Unicode art. In recent times, graphical icons, both static and animated, have joined the traditional text-based emoticons; these are commonly known as emoji.

Emoticons can generally be divided into three groups: Western (mainly from America and Europe) or horizontal (though not all are in that orientation); Eastern or vertical (mainly from east Asia); and 2channel style (originally used on 2channel and other Japanese message boards). The most common explanation for these different styles is that in the East, the eyes play the primary role in facial expressions, while in the West, the whole face tends to be used.

Western

Western style emoticons are mostly written from left to right as though the head is rotated counter-clockwise 90 degrees. One will most commonly see the eyes on the left, followed by the nose (often not included) and then the mouth. Typically, a colon is used for the eyes of a face, unless winking, in which case a semicolon is used. However, an equals sign, a number 8, or a capital letter B are also used to indicate normal eyes, widened eyes, or those with glasses, respectively. Symbols for the mouth vary, e.g. ")" for a smiley face or "(" for a sad face. One can also add a "}" after the mouth character to indicate a beard.

Eastern
Eastern emoticons generally are not rotated sideways, and may include non-Latin characters to allow for additional complexity.  These emoticons first arose in Japan, where they are referred to as kaomoji (literally "face characters").

2channel emoticons

 A number of Eastern emoticons were originally developed on the Japanese discussion site 2channel.  Some of these are wider (made up of more characters) than usual kaomoji, or extend over multiple lines of text.  Many use characters from other character sets besides Japanese and Latin.

Unicode characters
Many emoticons are included as characters in the Unicode standard, in the Miscellaneous Symbols block, the Emoticons block, and the Supplemental Symbols and Pictographs block.

References

 
ASCII art
Online chat
Internet memes
Technology-related lists